was a town located in Ōsato District, Saitama Prefecture, Japan.

As of 2003, the town had an estimated population of 8,325 and a density of 534.34 persons per km². The total area was 15.58 km².

On October 1, 2005, Ōsato, along with the town of Menuma (also from Ōsato District), was merged into the expanded city of Kumagaya and no longer exists as an independent municipality.

Dissolved municipalities of Saitama Prefecture
Kumagaya